The Second Mafia War was a period of conflict involving the Sicilian Mafia, mostly taking place from the late 1970s to the early 1990s and involved thousands of homicides. Sometimes referred to as The Great Mafia War or the Mattanza (Italian for 'Slaughter'), it involved the entire Mafia and radically altered the power balance within the organization. In addition to the violence within the Mafia itself, there was violence against the state, including a campaign of deliberate assassinations of judges, prosecutors, detectives, politicians, activists and other ideological enemies. In turn, the war resulted in a major crackdown against the Mafia, helped by the pentiti, Mafiosi who collaborated with the authorities after losing so many friends and relatives to the fighting. In effect, the conflict helped end the secrecy of the Mafia.

Preceding events 
The instigators of the Second Mafia War were the Corleonesi, the Mafia Family from the town of Corleone, although they were helped by a number of other Mafia Families. Hailing from a small rural town, the Corleonesi were often referred to as "the peasants" – i viddani in Sicilian – by other Mafia Families, especially by the powerful urbanized bosses in the capital of Palermo. Things began to change in the 1960s as the Corleonesi grew in power and prestige under the leadership of the brutal and ambitious Luciano Leggio, who had become the Mafia boss of Corleone via the crude but effective method of simply shooting the old one, Michele Navarra.

During the 1970s the Mafia in Sicily resumed its normal illicit business after the Mafia Trials of the 1960s had ended with few convictions. The Corleonesi's primary rivals were Stefano Bontade, Salvatore Inzerillo and Gaetano Badalamenti, bosses of various powerful Palermo Mafia Families. The Sicilian Mafia Commission was re-established in 1970, with Bontade and Badalementi making up two of the three leaders of the Commission. The third was Leggio, although he was represented by Salvatore Riina as Leggio was in hiding on the Italian mainland. When Leggio was captured in 1974 and imprisoned for murder, Riina soon took over as boss of the Corleonesi with Bernardo Provenzano.

The Corleonesi began to win over allies amongst other Mafia Families. Amongst those who aligned themselves with the Corleonesi were Palermo bosses Giuseppe Calò (boss of Porta Nuova), Filippo Marchese (boss of Corso Dei Mille) and Rosario Riccobono (boss of Partanna Mondello). In 1978, Riina managed to have Badalamenti expelled from the Commission, accused of having organised the assassination of Francesco Madonia (boss of Vallelunga and ally of the Corleonesi) and subsequently exiled from the Mafia and Sicily altogether. His place was taken by Ciaculli Godfather Michele "The Pope" Greco, who was also aligned with Riina. Greco, like Calò, Marchese and Riccobono, kept his alliance secret from the likes of Bontade and Inzerillo.

It was also in 1978 that Riina arranged for the murders of Giuseppe Di Cristina and Giuseppe Calderone, bosses of Riesi and Catania respectively. Both men were allies of Bontade and Inzerillo; their successors were allies of Riina, who sponsored them. Gradually, the bosses of Palermo and their men were isolated.

The Great Mafia War 
On 23 April 1981, Bontade was machine-gunned to death, and a few weeks later, on 11 May Inzerillo was killed in a hail of bullets. Various relatives and associates of the pair were subsequently killed or vanished without trace, including Inzerillo's 15-year-old son, who was killed for vowing to avenge his murdered father. On 29 September of the same year, Calogero Pizzuto, another close ally of Bontade and Inzerillo, was shot dead in a crowded bar alongside two innocent bystanders. Badalamenti only managed to survive by fleeing Sicily after the Corleonesi had him expelled in the late 1970s.

More and more killings took place over the next two years. On 30 November 1982, twelve Mafiosi were murdered in Palermo in twelve separate incidents. The murders extended across the Atlantic, with one of Inzerillo's brothers being found dead in New Jersey after fleeing to the U.S.  The dismembered body of one of Badalamenti's nephews turned up in a field in Germany. Amongst the many hitmen at the disposal of the Corleonesi and their allied clans was Giuseppe Greco from Ciaculli. He was a member of the Ciaculli clan headed by his uncle, Michele "The Pope" Greco, but was primarily at the disposal of Riina. An ace shot with an AK-47, Giuseppe Greco is suspected of killing around eighty people on behalf of Riina, including Bontade and Inzerillo. He led a "death squad" of hitmen, which included Mario Prestifilippo and Giuseppe Lucchese. Filippo Marchese, boss of Corso Dei Mille, also took an active part in the slaughter, as did his young nephew, Giuseppe Marchese who was caught in 1982. Vincenzo Puccio, another prolific assassin, missed most of the war as he was in prison until 1983.

During 1981 and 1983 there were at least 400 Mafia killings in Palermo and as many again across Sicily. In addition there were at least 160 cases of Mafiosi and their associates who vanished, victims of what is known as lupara bianca (Sicilian for "White Shotgun"), whereby the body is completely destroyed or buried so that it is never found. The Corleonesi and their allies were the overwhelming victors in the war, suffering few casualties themselves. One of the reasons was their natural secrecy. Whilst some Mafiosi lived quite publicly, putting on a persona of respectability, Riina, Provenzano, Leoluca Bagarella and their many killers spent years as fugitives, often rarely seen by fellow Mafiosi, let alone the public.

The fact that many bosses aligned themselves with the Corleonesi but without telling other mafiosi also aided the campaign in that these allies continued to have the misplaced trust of the Corleonesi's enemies. A prime example took place in late May, whereby 6 members of Bontade and Inzerillo's Mafia Families were invited to a meeting with one of their supposed friends. This 'friend' had, in fact, allied himself with the Corleonesi and the 6 who went along were vanished among them Emanuele D'Agostino, who sought refuge with one of Bontade's oldest allies, Rosario Riccobono. Riccobono had also secretly allied himself with the Corleonesi, and D'Agostino and his son were likewise eliminated. The only one of the six men to survive was Salvatore Contorno, who subsequently survived a murder attempt and went into hiding before he was caught by the police.

While on the run, Contorno sent anonymous letters to the police, giving up vital information about the war. This was invaluable to the authorities, who – like the losing clans – had little idea as to what exactly was going on with all the bloodshed. Mafiosi were obviously very secretive normally, and at the time of the Second Mafia War the authorities were at a loss to understand the exact allegiances and motives of the war. For example, when Bontade was murdered, for a short while, the police thought he had been killed as an act of treachery by Inzerillo, until he himself was killed. Deliberate disinformation was also employed by the Corleonesi. When Inzerillo died he was wanted for the murder three years previously of Giuseppe Di Cristina, but in fact the Corleonesi had murdered Di Cristina, deliberately doing so on Inzerillo's territory in order to frame him.

War against the Italian state

Whilst the Sicilian Mafia has generally been more inclined to kill authority figures than their American counterparts, this is still usually only as a last resort. The Corleonesi and their allies, however, started a specific campaign of assassination of state figures. Amongst the victims (known as "excellent cadavers") were police chiefs Emanuele Basile and Boris Giuliano, magistrates Rocco Chinnici and Cesare Terranova, and politicians Piersanti Mattarella and Pio La Torre. In one of the most brazen hits conducted by the mafia, General of the Italian Army Carlo Alberto Dalla Chiesa, who was serving as Palermo's prefect at that time, was killed together with his wife and police escort Domenico Russo. They were shot upon by motorcycle-riding gunmen carrying AK-47s led by Giuseppe Greco. Nonetheless a team of antimafia prosecutors, including Giovanni Falcone, Paolo Borsellino and Antonino Caponetto, laboured to orchestrate a concerted effort to combat the Mafia and the rising tide of violence, as well as the flow of heroin whose control was behind the war. The war against the Mafia resulted in the Maxi Trial of 1986, whereby hundreds of Mafiosi were convicted of a long litany of crimes.

Some of the investigations and crimes had begun in the 1970s but a bulk of the charges related to the Second Mafia War. Many of the defendants, such as Riina and Provenzano, were convicted in absentia as they were still fugitives at the time of the trial. The trial was significant as several Mafiosi on the losing side of the war, like Salvatore Contorno and Tommaso Buscetta, took the stand and testified against their former fellow Mafiosi, known as pentiti. In February 1980, Buscetta had fled to Brazil to escape the brewing Second Mafia War instigated by Salvatore Riina. On 11 September 1982, Buscetta's two sons from his first wife, Benedetto and Antonio, disappeared, never to be found again, which prompted his collaboration with Italian authorities. This was followed by the deaths of his brother Vincenzo, son-in-law Giuseppe Genova, brother-in-law Pietro and four of his nephews, Domenico and Benedetto Buscetta, and Orazio and Antonio D 'Amico. The war subsequently led to the deaths of many of Buscetta's allies, including Stefano Bontade. Buscetta was arrested in Sao Paulo, Brazil once again on 23 October 1983. He was extradited to Italy on 28 June 1984, where he attempted suicide by ingestion of barbiturates; when that failed, he decided that he was utterly disillusioned with the Mafia. Buscetta asked to talk to Falcone, and began his life as an informant, referred to as a pentito. The crackdown of the anti-mafia resulted in retaliative bombings and shootings.

Carabinieri captains Emanuele Basile, Mario D'Aleo, Giuseppe Bommarito and Pietro Morici, as well as Marshal Giuliano Guazzelli, were either gunned down or blown up. Falcone himself together with his wife and three police escorts were killed in the 1992 Capaci bombing. Two months later, the Via D'Amelio bombing killed another anti-mafia magistrate Paolo Borsellino and five policemen. The Circonvallazione massacre also killed three carabinieri escorts, Salvatore Raiti, Silvano Franzolin and Luigi Di Barca. Police Inspector Giovanni Lizzio was also killed in the war.

Continuing violence 

By the end of 1982 the Corleonesi and their allies were all but triumphant, with many of the surviving members of the old clans surrendering and switching their allegiance to the victors. The killing did not end, though. The Corleonesi decided to dispose of key allies, starting with Rosario Riccobono, who was killed along with over twenty of his associates and friends in late 1982, and swiftly followed by Filippo Marchese, who was strangled and dissolved in acid like many of those who had died at his hands.

The violence dragged on into the latter half of the 1980s as a result of the Corleonesi's treachery and desire to ensure their hegemony throughout the Mafia. Riccobono and Marchese were already eliminated by the start of 1983. Further murders followed, primarily involving Ciaculli killers Giuseppe Greco, Mario Prestifilippo and Vincenzo Puccio, and Agostino Marino Mannoia, who had switched sides from Bontade's to Riina's. These four men were invaluable to the Corleonesi throughout the first half of the 1980s, notching up literally hundreds of murders between them, but between 1985 and 1989 they were all murdered on the orders of the Corleonesi bosses, who saw them as having outlived their usefulness and/or perceived them as too ambitious and therefore a threat. Puccio's two brothers, also Mafiosi, were likewise killed.

Once again, the authorities were largely unaware of these new events in the closed world of the Mafia until they were confirmed by Francesco Marino Mannoia (brother of Agostino Marino Mannoia) in October 1989. He had been in prison since 1985 for trafficking heroin but had been kept up to date on incidents by Agostino, who visited him regularly. According to Francesco Mannoia, his brother, Vincenzo Puccio and Puccio's two brothers were killed after Riina discovered they had been plotting to overthrow him. Giuseppe Greco and Mario Prestifilippo were apparently slain because they became too ambitious.

Mannoia's information was confirmed in 1992 by several more , including Gaspare Mutolo, Giuseppe Marchese, and Leonardo Messina. They all complained of the same thing, that Riina and the other bosses of Corleone abandoned or eliminated their allies once they were of no further use or perceived as a potential threat. It seemed the only way to survive being an ally of Riina was to do exactly as he said. In an interview with Borsellino in 1992, Messina summed this up by stating that the Corleonesi bosses "used us to get rid of the old bosses, then they got rid of all those who raised their heads, like Giuseppe Greco, "the Shoe", Mario Prestifilippo and [Vincenzo] Puccio...all that's left are men without character, who are their puppets."

End of the 1980s

The primary result of the Second Mafia War was the victory of the Corleonesi and its bosses, Salvatore Riina and Bernardo Provenzano. By the mid-1980s they were effectively in charge of much of the Mafia and by the end of the decade, after many of their allies were eliminated or in prison, they effectively had a hegemony over the criminal organization.

This was summed up by Salvatore Contorno who, when asked at the Maxi Trial about the "winners" and "losers" of the Second Mafia War, declared: "The winning and losing clans don't exist, because the losers don't exist. They, the Corleonesi, killed them all."

See also
First Mafia War

References

Bibliography

Schneider, Jane T. & Peter T. Schneider (2003). Reversible Destiny: Mafia, Antimafia, and the Struggle for Palermo, Berkeley: University of California Press 
Sterling, Claire (1990). Octopus. How the long reach of the Sicilian Mafia controls the global narcotics trade, New York: Simon & Schuster, 

Corleonesi
History of the Sicilian Mafia
Organized crime conflicts in Italy
Terrorism in Italy